Obazoa (Brown et al., 2013) is a proposed sister clade of Amoebozoa (which together form Amorphea). Obazoa is composed of Breviatea, Apusomonadida and Opisthokonta. The term Obazoa is based on the OBA acronym for Opisthokonta, Breviatea, and Apusomonadida.

Determining the placement of Breviatea and Apusomonadida and their properties is of interest for the development of the opisthokonts in which the main lineages of animals and fungi emerged. The relationships among opisthokonts, breviates and apusomonads are not conclusively resolved (as of 2018), though Breviatea is usually inferred to be the most basal of the three lineages. Ribosomal RNA phylogenies do not usually recover Obazoa as a clade (see for example:), probably reflecting their stemming from a very ancient common ancestor, and little phylogenetic signal remains in datasets consisting of one or a few genes.

References 

 
Amorphea unranked clades